Ifrish Alberg (born 13 July 1988) is a Surinamese sprinter. He competed in the 100 metres event at the 2013 World Championships in Athletics.

References

External links

1988 births
Living people
Surinamese male sprinters
Place of birth missing (living people)
World Athletics Championships athletes for Suriname
Competitors at the 2010 Central American and Caribbean Games
Competitors at the 2010 South American Games
Competitors at the 2014 South American Games